A Beacon of Hope is a report issued by the United States Advisory Commission on International Educational and Cultural Affairs in 1963 on the Cold War exchange programs of the United States that brought foreign artists, educators and students to the United States, and sent American artists, educators and students overseas.

See also
Fulbright–Hays Act of 1961

Notes

External links
 A Beacon of Hope full text from Open Library

Reports of the United States government
Cultural exchange
1963 in the United States
1963 in international relations